Sosten Gwengwe (born 20 May 1977) is a Malawian politician currently serving as Minister of Finance and Economic Affairs of the Republic of Malawi since January 30, 2022. He previously served as Minister of Trade from June 2020 until his appointment as Finance and Economic Affairs Minister. He was elected to Parliament in 2009 as a member of the Malawi Congress Party, but announced on August 31, 2011 that he was switching to the Democratic Progressive Party because the MCP "had nothing to offer to the country" and the DPP under President Bingu wa Mutharika had a "clear vision of developing the country". Following the death of President Mutharika, he joined the People's Party.

Education Background

Gwengwe is a Chartered Management Accountant (CIMA) and has worked in both public and private sector. He holds a Bachelor of Accountancy degree which he obtained from the University of Malawi (The Polytechnic). He is also a holder of Master of Business Administration (Finance) from Oxford Brookes University of the United Kingdom.

Gwengwe has teaching experience after teaching  various Business Management courses at London Vocational, Management and Training Business School (an Emile Wolf College) in London. In Malawi, he established Dzuka Girls Secondary School, Dzuka Girls Primary School, Dzuka Private Academy, Alice Gwengwe Foundation, Sosten Gwengwe Foundation and Gwengwe Private Academy.

Political Career

Gwengwe is a member of Parliament for Lilongwe Msonzi North. His political career started in 2009 when he was first elected as Member of Parliament for Dedza Central Constituency. Gwengwe has served in the cabinet in various capacities and ministries including Ministry of Transport and Ministry of Industry and Trade. He is currently serving as Minister of Finance after being promoted in a February Cabinet Reshuffle by President Lazarus Chakwera.

In 2014, President Joyce Banda picked Gwengwe to be her running mate. Unfortunately Banda lost the elections and Gwengwe failed to become the Vice President of the country.

References

1977 births
Living people
Malawian accountants
Government ministers of Malawi
University of Malawi alumni
Alumni of Oxford Brookes University
Malawi Congress Party politicians
Democratic Progressive Party (Malawi) politicians
People's Party (Malawi) politicians